The Chinese Elm cultivar Ulmus parvifolia 'Matthew' is one of three American introductions selected for their cold hardiness (US zone 4 tolerant).

Description
The tree has an upright vase-shape, strong branches, and a bark that exfoliates at a relatively early age.

Pests and diseases
The species and its cultivars are highly resistant, but not immune, to Dutch elm disease, and unaffected by the Elm Leaf Beetle Xanthogaleruca luteola.

Cultivation
'Matthew' is not known to be in cultivation beyond North America.

Accessions
None known.

Nurseries

North America
 Earthscapes Inc., Loveland, Ohio, US.

References

External links
 Ulmus parvifolia cultivar list.

Chinese elm cultivar
Ulmus articles missing images
Ulmus